The Scottish Senior Citizens Unity Party (SSCUP), later the All-Scotland Pensioners Party from March 2011, was a Scottish political party. It was formed on 3 February 2003, in time to contest that year's elections to the Scottish Parliament. The leading figure in its formation and its first leader was John Swinburne, previously a director of Motherwell Football Club.  Swinburne was inspired to form the party after reading the UK government's plans for pensions in December 2002: he felt it was unfair that people might have to work longer in the future and consequently have less time to enjoy their retirement.

To fight elections, the SSCUP registered with the UK Electoral Commission and under the provisions of the Political Parties, Elections and Referendums Act 2000, the party also registered alternative names for use on ballot papers, including "Scottish Senior Citizens and Pensioners", and "Alliance of Scots Greys".

On the same day the SSCUP was launched, the Scottish Pensioners Party was formed in Fife. The SSCUP made an electoral pact with this party for the Scottish Parliamentary elections, whereby they did not stand candidates against each other. Former Scottish international footballers Billy McNeill, who played for Celtic and Eric Caldow, who played for Rangers, both stood for the SSCUP in these elections.

John Swinburne was the SSCUP's sole representative in the Scottish Parliament, representing Central Scotland from 2003 until 2007.

Party aims and elections
The party listed nine key aims on its website:
 An index-linked basic weekly state pension of £160 for all senior citizens
 Remove all senior citizens from poverty in Scotland
 Abolition of means-testing for senior citizens
 Replace council tax with a fairer system based on ability to pay
 Local authorities to set up more residential homes for senior citizens
 Free nationwide travel for all senior citizens - outside peak travelling times
 50% reduction in television licences for senior citizens aged 60 to 75
 50% reduction in vehicle excise duty for all senior citizens
 Establish a Scottish Lottery, with all profits going back into the community

In the 2007 Scottish Election the SSCUP lost its only seat in Holyrood, despite polling as the sixth best party and a slight increase in its vote share.  However, that was possibly due to the party putting up more candidates.  In 2011 their vote decreased, but they still remained the sixth placed party.

The party was de-registered in 2015.

References

Political parties established in 2003
Political parties disestablished in 2015
Pensioners' parties
Defunct political parties in Scotland
2003 establishments in Scotland
2015 disestablishments in Scotland